Sas II - is a Polish Coat of Arms. It was used by several szlachta families in the times of the Polish–Lithuanian Commonwealth.

History

Blazon

Notable bearers

Notable bearers of this Coat of Arms include:
Tomasz Sas

See also

 Polish heraldry
 Heraldry
 Coat of Arms
 List of Polish nobility coats of arms

Sources 
 Dynastic Genealogy 
 Ornatowski.com

Related coat of arms 

 Sas coat-of-arms

Polish coats of arms